Nathalia Milstein (born in 1995) is a French classical pianist.

Biography 
Born in Lyon, Milstein was born into a family of Russian musicians, and was initiated to the piano by her father Serguei Milstein at the age of 4. She entered the Conservatoire de Musique de Genève in 2009. She won the Flame Competition in 2008, 2009 and 2010.

In 2013, in the class of the Argentinean pianist , she obtained the Bachelor's degree of the Geneva Haute École de musique. In 2015, she continued her professional higher education in music at the Haute École de musique de Genève with a Master's degree as soloist. During her training, she attended the masterclasses of renowned classical pianists and teachers such as Elena Ashkenazy, Jean-Marc Luisada, Krzysztof Jablonski and Menahem Pressler.

Her grandfather Iakov Milstein was a musicologist and piano teacher at the Tchaikovsky Conservatory of Moscow.

Since 2005, she has been forming a duet with her sister, violinist .

Career 
In May 2015, Milstein became the first woman to win the 1st Prize at the Dublin International Piano Competition.

Following this recognition, she was invited to perform throughout the 2015-2016 season, in Europe and North America, in venues such as the Wigmore Hall in London and the Zankel Hall in New York.

In October 2015, she took part in the radio program "Génération Jeunes Interprètes" hosted by Gaëlle Le Gallic on France Musique.

On April 29, 2016, she accompanied the Orchestre philharmonique de Radio France, under the direction of Marcelo Lehninger and gave her first concert at the Maison de la Radio auditorium. She was rewarded the same year, with the Prix jeune soliste des médias francophones publics 2017.

Prizes and distinctions 
 Lauréate du Concours Flame (2008, 2009, 2010)  
 1er prix aux Concours du Conservatoire de musique de Genève (2010, 2011 and 2012)
 1er prix de sa catégorie au 3e Concours international de concerti in Manchester (2011) 
 2e prix au Grand Concours international de piano in Corbelin (July 2013)
 1er prix au Concours international de piano in Gaillard (juin 2014)
 1er prix au 10e Concours international de piano in Dublin (May 2015)
 Prix jeune soliste des médias francophones publics (2017)

References

External links 
 Nathalia Milstein's official website 
 Nathalia Milstein on Radio Classique
 Maria and Nathalia Milstein - The Vinteuil Sonata
 Chopin, Three Mazurkas Op. 63 by Nathalie Milstein (YouTube)

1995 births
Living people
21st-century French women classical pianists
Musicians from Lyon